Christopher E. Duliban (born January 9, 1963) is a former American football linebacker in the National Football League for the Dallas Cowboys. He played college football at the University of Texas.

Early years
Duliban attended Spring Woods High School, where he was a two-way player at running back and linebacker. He received All-district honors at linebacker as a junior. He received All-district honors at running back as a senior.

He accepted a football scholarship from the  University of Texas. He began his college career as a backup linebacker, playing mainly on special teams. As a sophomore, he led the team in special teams tackles, including 2 blocked kicks and one punt return for 19 yards. He had another blocked kick as a junior.

As a senior, he became a starter at outside linebacker, finishing with 98 tackles (third on the team), 10 sacks (second on the team), 7 passes defensed and one interception.

Professional career

Dallas Cowboys
Dulliban was selected in the 12th round (307th overall) of the 1986 NFL Draft by the Dallas Cowboys. On September 1, he was placed on the injured reserve list with a shoulder injury.

After the NFLPA strike was declared on the third week of the 1987 season, those contests were canceled (reducing the 16 game season to 15) and the NFL decided that the games would be played with replacement players. He crossed the picket line off the injured reserve to be a part of the Dallas replacement team that was given the mock name "Rhinestone Cowboys" by the media. He started 3 games at outside linebacker. He had 2 sacks against the New York Jets. On October 27, he was placed on the injured reserve list. He was cut on November 3.

Buffalo Bills
On March 16, 1988, he was signed as a free agent by the Buffalo Bills. He was released on August 16.

Personal life
In 1996, he was the head coach for Hyde Park Baptist High School, he reached the playoffs in 9 out of 12 seasons (4 semi-finals and 9 quarter-finals). In 1999, he was the defensive coordinator for the Texas Terminators of the Indoor Professional Football League. In 2001, he was named the head coach of the Austin Rockers in the National Indoor Football League.

In 2007, he was named the head coach for the CenTex Barracudas of the Intense Football League, the next year he won the first playoff game in team history. In 2009, he was named the head coach for the inaugural season of the Austin Turfcats in the Southern Indoor Football League.

References

1963 births
Living people
American football linebackers
Dallas Cowboys players
Texas Longhorns football players
National Football League replacement players
High school football coaches in Texas
Sportspeople from Champaign, Illinois
Players of American football from Illinois